Requiem for the American Dream: The 10 Principles of Concentration of Wealth & Power is a book by political activist and linguist Noam Chomsky. It was created and edited by Peter Hutchinson, Kelly Nyks, and Jared P. Scott. It lays out Chomsky's analysis of neoliberalism. It focuses on the concentration of wealth and power in United States over the past forty years, analyzing the income inequality. The book was published by Seven Stories Press in 2017.

Overview  
The book charts Chomsky's analysis of the concentration of wealth from the 1970s to now. Chomsky analyzes the way in which power relations shifted from the late 1940s to today, in the name of "plutocratic interests". This shift in power relations ends up being an assault "on lower- and middle-class people, which has escalated in recent decades during the ascendancy of what is known as 'neoliberalism' – with fiscal austerity for the poor and tax cuts and other subsidies for the wealthy minority." Chomsky is most interested in how the rise of financialization, which "is a process whereby financial markets, financial institutions, and financial elites gain greater influence over economic policy and economic outcomes," and how it affects and shapes public life in America, leading to a concentration of wealth and power to elite persons and institutions. This has been shown to lead to phenomena like the richest people in the world having as much wealth as the bottom half of the world.

Summary of the ten principles 
Chomsky starts by observing that concentration of wealth yields concentration of power, particularly so as the cost of elections skyrockets, which forces the political parties into the pockets of major corporations. This political power then quickly translates into legislation that increases the concentration of wealth. Hence, fiscal policy like tax policy, deregulation, rules of corporate governance and a whole variety of political measures increase the concentration of wealth and power which, in turn, yields more political power to the rich. The book is organized around what Chomsky argues are the 10 principles which lead to this concentration of wealth and power.

 Reduce Democracy: James Madison, one of the founding fathers of the United States constitution pointed out that with more democracy, the poor could be able to join forces and take away the property of the rich, in his own words "the major concern of society has to be to protect the minority of the opulent against the majority". Aristotle's Politics points out the same dilemma but proposes a different solution, instead of 'reducing democracy' he suggests to reduce inequalities with what we nowadays call a welfare state. The United States has seen an ongoing clash between pressure for more freedom and democracy (coming from below) and elite control (coming from above). For instance, the 1960s were a period of significant democratization during which consciousness about minority rights, women's rights, the environment and warfare shifted. 
 Shape Ideology: This period of democratization was followed by a backlash from multinational corporations and financial institutions in the 1970s. On the right side, the Powell Memorandum warned that business was losing control of society and that something had to be done to control these forces. On the liberal side, similar ideas arose. The first major report of the Trilateral Commission warns about 'the crisis of democracy', more precisely an 'excess of democracy'. In this report, liberals were particularly concerned with was happening to young people "the young people are getting too free and independent" and the schools and the universities are responsible for the "indoctrination of the young". Interestingly, this report never mentions private business. This omission can be interpreted as private business being de facto the national interest. 
 Redesign the Economy
 Shift the Burden
 Attack Solidarity
 Run the Regulators
 Engineer Elections
 Keep the Rabble in Line
 Manufacture Consent
 Marginalize the Population

Reception 
Reception to this has been generally positive, with Publishers Weekly saying "Chomsky and his collaborators have created a perceptive and revelatory examination of the forces driving America inequality."

Film 
A documentary film of the same name, Requiem for the American Dream, featuring Noam Chomsky and directed by Peter D. Hutchison, Kelly Nyks, and Jared P. Scott was released in 2015.

References 

Books by Noam Chomsky
Neoliberalism
2017 non-fiction books
Seven Stories Press books